The Merten M. Hasse Prize is awarded every two years by the Mathematical Association of America (MAA) to recognize an exceptional expository paper appearing in an MAA publication, at least one of whose authors is a younger mathematician, generally under the age of forty. First awarded in 1987, the prize honors inspiring and dedicated teachers and encourages young mathematicians to take up the challenge of exposition and communication.

Recipients 
The recipients of the Merten M. Hasse Prize are:
 2019: David Treeby
 2017:  Lasse Rempe-Gillen and Zhaiming Shen
 2015:  Charles Doran and Ursula Whitcher
 2013:  Henryk Gerlach and Heiko von der Mosel
 2011:  Alissa S. Crans, Thomas M. Fiore, and Ramon Satyendra
 2009:  Andrew Bashelor, Amy Ksir, and Will Traves
 2007:  Franklin Mendivil
 2005:  Maureen T. Carroll and Steven T. Dougherty
 2003:  Manjul Bhargava
 2001:  Francis Edward Su
 1999:  Aleksandar Jurisic
 1997:  Jonathan King
 1995:  Andrew Granville
 1993:  David H. Bailey,  Jonathan M. Borwein, and Peter B. Borwein
 1991:  Barry Arthur Cipra
 1989:  Irl Bivens
 1987:  Anthony Barcellos

See also

 List of mathematics awards

References 

Awards of the Mathematical Association of America